After the Gold Rush is the third studio album by the Canadian-American musician Neil Young, released in September 1970 on Reprise Records, catalogue number RS 6383. It is one of four high-profile solo albums released by the members of folk rock group Crosby, Stills, Nash & Young in the wake of their chart-topping 1970 album Déjà Vu. Young's album consists mainly of country folk music along with several rock tracks, including "Southern Man". The material was inspired by the unproduced Dean Stockwell-Herb Bermann screenplay After the Gold Rush.

After the Gold Rush peaked at number eight on the Billboard Top Pop Albums chart; the two singles taken from the album, "Only Love Can Break Your Heart" and "When You Dance I Can Really Love", made it to number 33 and number 93 respectively on the Billboard Hot 100. Despite a mixed initial reaction, the album has since appeared on a number of greatest albums of all time lists.

In 2014, the album was inducted into the Grammy Hall of Fame.

Production
After the Gold Rush is one of four high-profile albums (all charting within the top fifteen) released by each of the members of folk rock collective Crosby, Stills, Nash & Young in the wake of their chart-topping 1970 album Déjà Vu, along with Stephen Stills (Stephen Stills, November 1970), If I Could Only Remember My Name (David Crosby, February 1971) and Songs for Beginners (Graham Nash, May 1971). Initial sessions were conducted with backing band Crazy Horse at Sunset Sound Studios in August 1969, shortly before Young embarked on a tour of the US with Crosby Stills Nash & Young that would include their now-famous appearance at Woodstock. Although progress was hampered by the deteriorating health of rhythm guitarist Danny Whitten, the sessions yielded two released tracks, "I Believe In You" and "Oh, Lonesome Me".

Except for the track "Birds", recorded on June 30, 1970, at Sound City Studios, the remainder of the album was recorded at various sessions in a makeshift basement studio ("Redwood Studios") in Young's Topanga Canyon home during March and April 1970 with CSNY bassist Greg Reeves, Crazy Horse drummer Ralph Molina and burgeoning eighteen-year-old musical prodigy Nils Lofgren of the Washington, D.C.-based band Grin on piano. The incorporation of Lofgren was a characteristically idiosyncratic decision by Young, as Lofgren had not played keyboards on a regular basis prior to the sessions. Along with Jack Nitzsche, Lofgren would join an augmented Crazy Horse sans Young before enjoying success with his own group as well as solo cult success and membership in Bruce Springsteen's E Street Band. Biographer Jimmy McDonough has asserted that Young was intentionally trying to combine Crazy Horse and CSNY on this release, with members of the former band appearing alongside Stephen Stills (who contributed backing vocals to "Only Love Can Break Your Heart") and Reeves. The cover art is a solarized image of Young passing an old woman at the New York University School of Law campus in the Greenwich Village district of New York City. The picture was taken by photographer Joel Bernstein and was reportedly out of focus. It was because of this he decided to mask the blurred face by solarizing the image.  The photo is cropped; the original image included Young's friend and CSNY bandmate Graham Nash.

Songs on the album were inspired by the Dean Stockwell-Herb Bermann screenplay for the unmade film After the Gold Rush. Young had read the screenplay and asked Stockwell if he could produce the soundtrack. Tracks that Young recalls as being written specifically for the film are "After the Gold Rush" and "Cripple Creek Ferry". The script has since been lost, though it has been described as "sort of an end-of-the-world movie." Stockwell said of it, "I was gonna write a movie that was personal, a Jungian self-discovery of the gnosis ... it involved the Kabala , it involved a lot of arcane stuff." Graham Nash has claimed that "Only Love Can Break Your Heart" was written for him in the aftermath of his breakup with Joni Mitchell.

According to the Neil Young Archives, After the Gold Rush was released on September 19, 1970. One month later, on October 24, the lead single "Only Love Can Break Your Heart" entered the Billboard Hot 100 chart. An outtake version of "Birds" recorded at the initial Sunset Sound sessions has now been added to the album on the Neil Young Archives website, as have two versions of the song "Wonderin'".

Reception

Critics were not immediately impressed; the 1970 review in Rolling Stone magazine by Langdon Winner was negative, with Winner feeling that, "none of the songs here rise above the uniformly dull surface." Village Voice critic Robert Christgau was more enthusiastic, saying: "While David Crosby yowls about assassinations, Young divulges darker agonies without even bothering to make them explicit. Here the gaunt pain of Everybody Knows This Is Nowhere fills out a little—the voice softer, the jangling guitar muted behind a piano. Young's melodies—every one of them—are impossible to dismiss. He can write 'poetic' lyrics without falling flat on his metaphor even when the subject is ecology or crumbling empire. And despite his acoustic tenor, he rocks plenty. A real rarity: pleasant and hard at the same time."

Critical reaction has improved with time; by 1975, Rolling Stone was referring to the album as a "masterpiece", and Gold Rush is now considered a classic album in Young's recording career.

Accolades
According to Acclaimed Music, it is the 60th most celebrated album in popular music history.

After the Gold Rush has appeared on a number of greatest albums lists. In 1998 Q magazine readers voted After the Gold Rush the 89th greatest album of all time. It was ranked 92nd in a 2005 survey held by British television's Channel 4 to determine the 100 greatest albums of all time. In 2003, Rolling Stone named the album the 71st greatest album of all time, 74th in a 2012 revised list, and 90th in the 2020 list. Pitchfork listed it 99th on their 2004 list of the "Top 100 Albums of the 1970s". In 2006, Time magazine listed it as one of the "All-Time 100 Albums". It was ranked third in Bob Mersereau's 2007 book The Top 100 Canadian Albums. Its follow-up album, Harvest, was named the greatest Canadian album of all time in that book. In 2005, Chart magazine readers placed it fifth on a poll of the best Canadian albums. In 2002, Blender magazine named it the 86th greatest "American" album. New Musical Express named it the 80th greatest album of all time in 2003.  The album was also included in the book 1001 Albums You Must Hear Before You Die.  It was voted number 62 in Colin Larkin's All Time Top 1000 Albums 3rd edition (2000).

Releases
After the Gold Rush was originally released on vinyl by Reprise on September 19, 1970. It was subsequently reissued on CD in 1986.

A remastered version was released on HDCD-encoded CD and digital download on July 14, 2009 as part of the Neil Young Archives Original Release Series. The remastered CD exists both as a standalone album and as Disc 3 of a 4-CD box set Official Release Series Discs 1-4, released in the US in 2009 and Europe in 2012.

To mark its 50th anniversary, a CD version of the album was re-released by Reprise on December 11, 2020 as After The Gold Rush 50th Anniversary Edition, the original cover having been enhanced with a 50 below its title. A vinyl box set is scheduled to become available on March 19, 2021. The re-release includes two different versions of the song "Wonderin'" - on the CD as two extra tracks and in the vinyl box set as a 45rpm single in a picture sleeve. Side A, originally included on the Topanga 3 disc in The Archives Vol. 1: 1963-1972, was recorded in Topanga, California, in March 1970; Side B is a previously unreleased version recorded at Sunset Sound in Hollywood in August 1969.

Digital high-resolution files of the album are also available via the Neil Young Archives website, including a longer 3:36 outtake of "Birds" recorded at the same Sunset Sound sessions as "Wonderin'".

Track listing
All tracks are written by Neil Young, except where noted. Track timings are from the original 1970 vinyl release, catalogue number RS 6383.

Note
 "When You Dance, I Can Really Love" was incorrectly listed as "When You Dance You Can Really Love" on both the back cover and the disc label of the first CD issue by Reprise (catalogue number 2283-2). This was corrected in the 2009 Original Release Series remaster.

Personnel
 Neil Young – guitar, piano, harmonica, vibes, lead vocals
 Danny Whitten – guitar, vocals
 Nils Lofgren – guitar, piano, vocals
 Jack Nitzsche – piano
 Billy Talbot – bass
 Greg Reeves – bass
 Ralph Molina – drums, vocals
 Stephen Stills – vocals (credited as Steve Stills)
 Bill Peterson – flugelhorn

Charts

Weekly charts

Single

Year End Charts

Certifications and sales

References

Neil Young albums
1970 albums
Albums produced by David Briggs (producer)
Reprise Records albums
Albums produced by Neil Young
Albums recorded at Sunset Sound Recorders
Albums recorded in a home studio
Albums recorded at Sound City Studios
Grammy Hall of Fame Award recipients
Country rock albums by Canadian artists